Arthur Emil Tokle (August 16, 1922 – March 3, 2005) was a Norwegian-born American ski jumper who competed for the United States at the 1952 Winter Olympics in Oslo, finishing 18th in the individual large hill event.

Biography
Tokle was born in Løkken Verk, a village in Meldal, Sør-Trøndelag county, Norway. His father was a Norwegian mining official, who raised every one of his 20 children in the sport, and skied himself until he was well past 70. Torger Tokle, Art's older brother, came to the U.S. in 1939 and gained sudden fame before he was killed in Italy as a ski trooper in 1945. Kyrre Tokle, another older brother, was still jumping in informal meets in the U.S. at the age of 55. 

Arthur  Tokle won his first national championship as a teenager and served in the Kings Guard before immigrating to America in 1947.  He was US national ski jumping champion in 1951 and 1953. Tokle carried the American flag during the opening ceremonies of the 1958 FIS Nordic World Ski Championships in Lahti, Finland and competed in the 1960 Winter Olympics in Squaw Valley. He later coached the American ski jumping team at the 1964 and 1968 Winter Olympics. Tokle was inducted in the National Ski Hall of Fame in 1970. He was a technical director for the US team at the 1980 Winter Olympics. He co-authored The Complete Guide to Cross Country Skiing and Touring.

Personal life
In 1948, Tokle married Oddfrid Larsen and settled in Lake Telemark, New Jersey, a semi-rural community favored by Scandinavian immigrants. Together they had two children Arthur  Tokle Jr. and Vivian Lynch.

References

External links
March 2005 blog of death .

1922 births
2005 deaths
Olympic ski jumpers of the United States
American male ski jumpers
Ski jumpers at the 1952 Winter Olympics
Ski jumpers at the 1960 Winter Olympics
Norwegian emigrants to the United States
People from Meldal